Poprad is a city in northern Slovakia at the foot of the High Tatra Mountains, famous for its picturesque historic centre and as a holiday resort. It is the biggest town of the Spiš region and the tenth largest city in Slovakia, with a population of approximately 50,000.

The Poprad-Tatry Airport is an international airport located just outside the city. Poprad is also the starting point of the Tatra Electric Railway (known in Slovak as Tatranská elektrická železnica), a set of special narrow-gauge trains (trams) connecting the resorts in the High Tatras with each other and with Poprad. Main line trains link Poprad to other destinations in Slovakia and beyond; in particular, there are through trains running from Poprad to Prague in the Czech Republic.

History
The territory was since the Migration Period inhabited by Slavic settlers. The first written record dates from March 16, 1256 in the deed of donation of the Hungarian King Bela IV. It was colonized in the 13th century by German settlers and became the largely German town Deutschendorf meaning 'Germans' village'. From 1412 to 1770, as one of the Spis towns, Poprad was pawned by the Kingdom of Hungary to the Kingdom of Poland, resulting in a strong Polish influence on the city's further development. In the 17th century, the number of Germans began to decline. Since 1918 this territory was placed under the control of Czechoslovakia.

Poprad itself was for 690 years (up until 1946) just one of several neighbouring settlements, which currently make up the modern city. The other parts of the current municipality are Matejovce (German: Matzdorf; Hungarian: Mateóc, first reference 1251), Spišská Sobota (German: Georgenberg; Hungarian: Szepesszombat, 1256), Veľká (German/Hungarian: Felka, 1268), and Stráže pod Tatrami (German: Michelsdorf; Hungarian: Strázsa, 1276). The most significant of these original towns was Georgenberg, now Spišská Sobota, which preserved its dominant position in the area until the late 19th century.

In 1942, during World War II, most of the transports of Jews to ghettos and concentration camps in German-occupied Poland were sent from the Poprad railway station. The first transport of about 1,000 Jewish girls and young women left Poprad on March 25, 1942 for Auschwitz-Birkenau. By the end of 1942, when the deportations stopped, over 58,000 Jews had been deported from Slovakia to German-occupied Poland via Poprad.

Poprad was liberated on January 28, 1945 by troops of the Soviet 18th Army. The German population was expelled afterwards.

After the war, with the development of winter sports, Poprad became the starting point for expeditions to the High Tatras.

In 1999, Poprad put in a bid to host the 2006 Winter Olympics, but lost to Turin, Italy.

Geography

Poprad is situated on the Poprad River in the Sub-Tatra Basin, and is a gateway to the High Tatras. Mountain ranges around the city include the Levoča Hills in the east, Kozie chrbty in the south, and the Low Tatras in the southwest. The drainage divide between the Black Sea and Baltic Sea lies a bit to the west, near the village of Štrba.

Climate
Poprad lies in the north temperate zone and has a humid continental climate (Köppen Dfb) with four distinct seasons. It is characterized by a significant variation between warm summers and cold winters.

Demographics
Poprad has a population of 55,158 (as of December 31, 2005). According to the 2001 census, 94.1% of inhabitants were Slovaks, 2.1% Romani, 1% Czechs, 0.2% Hungarians, 0.2% Germans, 0.1% Rusyns, 0.1% Ukrainians, and 0.1% Poles.

Religion 
The oldest churches here are the Roman Catholic Church and the Evangelical Church of the Augsburg Confession (lutherans). It also operates here: the Greek Catholic Church and Orthodox Church, Baptists, the Apostolic Church, Seventh-day Adventists, the Pentecostal Charismatic Church, and Jehovah's Witnesses.

Poprad

 Concathedral of Virgin Mary (Roman Catholic) 
 Church of st. Egidius (Roman Catholic) 
 Church of st. Cyril and Methodius (Roman Catholic) 
 Church of Holy Trinity (Lutheran) 
 Pentecostal Church
 Church of st. Peter and Paul (Greek Catholic) 

Kingdom Hall of Jehovah's Witness 
Church of Holy Cross (Orthodox)
 
Veľká

 Church of st. John (Roman Catholic - Salesians)  
 Church of Holy Trinity (Lutheran)  
 Baptist church 
 Church of Seventh-day Adventists

Spišská Sobota

 Church of st. George (Roman Catholic)  
 Lutheran church

Matejovce

 Church of st. Stephen (Roman Catholic)  
 Lutheran church

Stráže pod Tatrami

 Church of st. John (Roman Catholic)  
 Lutheran church

Kvetnica

 Church of st. Helen (Roman Catholic)

Landmarks

The historical centre is concentrated around the St. Egidius square (Námestie svätého Egídia), which is rimmed with houses predominantly from the 18th and 19th centuries. Churches in the city include the early-Gothic Catholic Church of St. Egidius from the late 13th century.

Another historical centre near Poprad is in Spišská Sobota, which was declared in 1953 to be a Town Monument Reserve. A significant landmark there is the Church of St. George, with five late-Gothic side altars and a main altar from the workshop of Master Paul of Levoča.

Modern places of interest include a new water park called AquaCity Poprad.

Government

Between 2003 and 2014, the mayor of Poprad was Anton Danko (former international ice-hockey referee). In the November 2014 municipal elections, he lost to Jozef Švagerko (KDH – Christian democrats).

Territorial division
The city is divided into six boroughs for the purpose of municipal administrative division:
 Staré Mesto ["Old Town"]
 Spišská Sobota
 Stráže
 Veľká
 Matejovce
 Kvetnica

Sport

Poprad currently has one ice hockey club, HK Poprad who play at the Poprad Ice Stadium.

Lev Poprad was another ice hockey club in Poprad, who used to play in the KHL for one season but was moved to the Czech capital, Prague, in 2012. Despite successful 2013/2014 seasons, club has ended due to financial problems.  There is a number of former and current ice hockey players in NHL who were born in Poprad.

The city also hosted the 1994 Men's Ice Hockey World Championships, 
1999 European Youth Olympic Winter Days, 2017 IIHF World U18 Championships and 1999 Winter Universiade. Every year the ice hockey Tatra Cup is held. There was also an unsuccessful bid to host the 2006 Winter Olympics.

There are many football stadiums in Poprad, however the main one is NTC Poprad, home of FK Poprad founded in 1906 and the Slovakia national youth teams.

The local women's basketball club is Basketbalová Akadémia Mládeže Poprad (BAMP). Their matches are played in Aréna Poprad. The arena also was one of the venues at the 2017 editions of the FIVB Volleyball World League.

Education
The city's system of primary education consists of 12 public schools, and one religious primary school, enrolling in total 5,464 pupils. Secondary education is represented by four grammar schools with 1,800 students, three specialized high schools with 1,566 students, and four vocational schools with 2,045 students (data as of 2007).

Transport

Poprad is a gateway to the High Tatra mountain range, which is a popular tourist destination. The city lies on the main road (E 50) and railway connecting western and eastern Slovakia.

Poprad-Tatry railway station links Poprad with other major destinations on Slovakia's standard gauge rail network, and with the mountains via the metre gauge Tatra Electric Railway. The direct trains SuperCity Pendolino connects Poprad with Prague.

International Poprad–Tatry Airport from 1938, is an airport with the highest elevation in Central Europe. It also offers scheduled flights to London.

Bus transport 

Rail transport 
Lines: ,

Personalities
Daniela Hantuchová – professional grand slam winning tennis player 
Peter Bondra – ice hockey player, more than 500 goals and more than 1000 games in NHL
Jan Brokoff – Baroque-era sculptor and carver (born 1652 in Spišská Sobota – died 1718 in Prague)
Adolf Burger – author of memoirs on Operation Bernhard filmed as the Oscar-winning The Counterfeiters, grew up and trained in Poprad
Peter Ihnačák – Ice hockey player born in 1957 in Poprad
Leslie Kish –  statistician, was born in Poprad
Boris Prokopič – Austrian football player
Miroslav Lajčák – diplomat, born in Poprad
Peter Svätojánsky – ski mountaineer
Tibor Sekelj – explorer, Esperantist, writer and lawyer 
Anton Gavel – Slovak basketball player
Andrej Kiska – businessman, entrepreneur and former president of Slovakia

Twin towns – sister cities

Poprad is twinned with:

 Ústí nad Orlicí, Czech Republic
 Zakopane, Poland
 Vysoké Tatry, Slovakia
 Szarvas, Hungary
 Widnes, England, UK
 Oulu, Finland

References

External links

 Official website of Poprad municipality
 House of Photography in Poprad

Photos and videos
 360° QTVR fullscreen panoramas of the Poprad city

 
Cities and towns in Slovakia
Spiš
Villages and municipalities in Poprad District